Dismal Ridge is a forked ridge leading north and east from the Mount Kempe – Mount Huggins saddle in Antarctica. It is bounded on the north and west by Radian Glacier and Glimpse Glacier, and on the south by Kempe Glacier. The two forks enclose the Glee Glacier and descend to Roaring Valley. The ridge was so named by the Victoria University of Wellington Antarctic Expedition, 1960–61, because of the persistently dismal weather conditions encountered while they were mapping in January 1961, and also because of difficulties encountered in establishing a high food camp on this ridge by helicopter, again owing to the weather.

References 

Ridges of Victoria Land
Scott Coast